The NATO Military Engineering Centre of Excellence (MILENG COE) is an International Military Organization (IMO) as designated by the Paris Protocol of 28 August 1952. The organization is a part of the NATO Centre of Excellence. Sponsored by fourteen European Union Member States, the United Kingdom, Turkey, Canada, and the United States, the Centre belongs to a wider framework that supports NATO’s transformation process. The organization's objective is to assist NATO member countries, nonmember countries, and international organizations in enhancing military engineering capabilities. MILENG COE is co-located in the German Army Military Engineer School in Ingolstadt, Germany. A sister-project is the NATO Cooperative Cyber Defence Centre of Excellence (CCDCOE).

Before becoming a NATO Centre of Excellence, the institute was known as the Euro NATO Training Engineer Centre (ENTEC) and was located in Munich. As ENTEC, the institute was mandated to conduct military engineer training for participating nations.

Mission and task 
As the MILENG COE, the institute's mandate expanded to include teaching doctrine and the NATO Standardization Agreements related to military engineering. The Centre also contributes new concepts and procedures, conducts experiments and analyses, and offers engineering expertise for NATO programs.

The Centre's work is usually initiated by a "Request for Support" by a NATO entity or participating nation. Additionally, there is an annual Program of Work which contains long term projects with a certain product and deadline, as well as activities to actively support NATO transformation. The Centre also plans and conducts conferences and worksites for military engineers.

The Centre brings together experts in the areas of general military engineering, explosive ordnance disposal, environmental protection, and infrastructure management.

Current status 
Currently, 17 Sponsoring Nations have joined the Centre:

See also 
 Allied Command Transformation
 NATO 2021 list of accredited COEs

References

External links 
   Official Webpage
 Antwort der Bundesregierung auf die Kleine Anfrage der Abgeordneten Sevim Dağdelen, Christine Buchholz, Eva Bulling-Schröter, weiterer Abgeordneter und der Fraktion DIE LINKE. – Drucksache 18/9226 – vom 19. August 2016

NATO agencies